"Major Tom (Coming Home)" ('Major Tom [completely detached]') is a song by singer Peter Schilling from his album Error in the System. With a character unofficially related to "Major Tom", the protagonist of David Bowie's 1969 song "Space Oddity", the song is about the character breaking off contact with ground control and traveling off into space.

The song was originally recorded in German and released in West Germany on 3 January 1983. It reached No. 1 in West Germany, Austria, and Switzerland. The English version was first released in the United States on 24 September 1983. It reached No. 1 in Canada, No. 4 in South Africa and peaked at No. 14 on the US Billboard Hot 100 Singles chart the week of 24 December 1983. The English-language version of the song also reached No. 2 on the dance chart in the US. 
In 1994, Schilling made and released a remixed version along with Boom-Bastic, titled "Major Tom 94". Other remixes were released in 2000, titled "Major Tom 2000", and in 2003, titled "Major Tom 2003".

Charts

Certifications

Cover versions
 Plastic Bertrand released a French language cover of the song in 1983 from the album Chat va?...Et toi?.
English singer-songwriter Jonathan King released a mashup of "Major Tom (Coming Home)" together with David Bowie's "Space Oddity" titled "Space Oddity / Major Tom (Coming Home)". This release reached No. 77 on the UK Singles Chart in May 1984.
A cover version by Shiny Toy Guns, was released in 2009; an advertising commercial for the Lincoln MKZ, featured this cover.
 American hard rock band Heaven Below released a cover in 2009 on their debut album Countdown to Devil and included a live recording on its companion album Reworking the Devil that same year.
Actor William Shatner released a cover in 2011 on the space-themed album Seeking Major Tom.
Apoptygma Berzerk released an EP in 2013 titled Major Tom that contains a cover and several remixes. 
The outsider artist The Space Lady also covered the song on the 2013 release "Major Tom/Radar Love".
In 2016, Jay Del Alma released a Spanish-language remake titled "Vuela (Major Tom)" with Schilling on vocals. 
Another remix was published in 2020 by Spinnin' Records alongside Austrian DJ LUM!X and German DJ duo Hyperclap.

In popular media
The song was used as the theme song for the TV show series Deutschland 83. 
The song was used in AMC's Breaking Bad, in a scene where Hank Schrader, Walter White, and Walter Jr. watch a video of the drug chemist Gale Boetticher singing the song at a karaoke bar on a vacation to Thailand.
In season 2, episode 5 of the Netflix original series The Umbrella Academy, the song was used when Pogo, the chimpanzee character on the show, was traveling into outer space and back to earth.
The song was used in the Car Escape scene in Atomic Blonde (2017) when Lorraine Broughton, played by Charlize Theron, fights off would be assailants inside an Audi V8 D1 Typ 4C after arriving in Berlin. 
It was also used in the 4th season of the show The Americans. 
An instrumental version of the song was used during the 1980s as the introduction music of the San Diego Sockers (1978-1996).
The German version was used the series The Blacklist Season 2 Episode 14 T Earl King VI

References

1983 songs
1983 singles
Peter Schilling songs
German-language songs
Number-one singles in Austria
Number-one singles in Canada
Number-one singles in Germany
Number-one singles in Switzerland
RPM Top Singles number-one singles
Answer songs
Songs about spaceflight
Space rock songs
Elektra Records singles
Warner Music Group singles
Major Tom
Songs about fictional male characters
Songs about outer space